The Bunbury Music Festival is a three-day music festival in Cincinnati, Ohio, United States, at Sawyer Point Park & Yeatman's Cove on the banks of the Ohio River. Each annual event typically features over 100 acts performing on three to six separate stages through the park. The festival was founded by MidPoint Music Festival co-founder and former Fountain Square managing director Bill Donabedian. The festival's inaugural event took place July 13–15, 2012. In 2014, Bunbury was purchased by PromoWest Productions, an entertainment company operating out of Columbus, Ohio.

The most recent iteration of the event occurred May 31 through June 2, 2019. It has been on hiatus ever since.

List of events

Namesake 
The name "Bunbury" was chosen by festival founder Bill Donabedian after he heard the word used in Oscar Wilde's play The Importance of Being Earnest. He chose the word because he thought it sounded whimsical and he liked the definition: "to have a made up excuse to get out of doing something boring." In Wilde's play, the character Algernon utilizes the fictional character named Bunbury as an excuse for getting out of undesirable situations such as family events. Not to be confused with the Western Australian city of Bunbury.

References

External links 
 
 

Festivals in Cincinnati
Music festivals in Ohio
Music of Cincinnati